The following is a list of notable people associated with San Francisco State University, located in the American city of San Francisco, California. Many alumni may still need to be added to the San Francisco State University alumni category.

Notable alumni

Art
 Alvin Ailey (1931-1989) –  dance choreographer and activist
 Opal Palmer Adisa – artist, writer
 Debra Bloomfield – artist, photographer
 Lenore Chinn – painter
 Roy De Forest (1930-2007) – painter and sculptor
 Phoebe Gloeckner – visual artist and cartoonist
 Suzanne Jackson – visual artist, poet, and dancer
 Elliott Linwood – conceptual artist
 Fred Rinne – visual and performance artist
 Hannah Stouffer – artist

Business
 Solomon Darwin – Professor of Business at Haas School of Business and known for his development of "smart village" frameworks for Indian villages
 Barnaby Dorfman – founder and CEO of Foodista.com
 Greg Fischbach – founder, Acclaim Entertainment
 Chris Larsen – billionaire founder of E-Loan and Ripple Labs
 George M. Marcus – billionaire real estate broker, founder of Marcus & Millichap
 Manny Mashouf – billionaire founder of bebe stores clothing retail shops
 Jayshree Ullal – president and CEO of Arista Networks
 Stephen Wolf – chairman of R.R. Donnelley & Sons Company
 David Woodard – businessman

Journalism
 Amy L. Alexander – author; journalist for The Washington Post, NPR, The Root, and The Nation, as well as many newspapers
 Mark Arnold – self-published author
 Ken Bastida – news anchor for KPIX
 Melba Pattillo Beals – journalist and member of the Little Rock Nine
 Po Bronson – journalist and author
 Howard Bryant – senior writer for ESPN.com and ESPN The Magazine'
 Stan Bunger – morning co-anchor at KCBS All News 740/FM 106.9
 David Farley – Author of "An Irreverent Curiosity", food and travel writer
 Ben Fong-Torres – writer, broadcaster, editor at Rolling Stone Mike Galanos – news anchor for HLN
 Kimberly Hunt –  chief anchor and managing editor for KGTV, San Diego
 Al Martinez (1929-2015) – Pulitzer Prize-winning journalist
 Michael Moss – Pulitzer Prize-winning journalist
 Cyrus Saatsaz – KNBR Creative Director, host of The Extreme Scene, action sports writer
 Frank Somerville – news anchor for KTVU Fox 2 in Oakland, California
 Jose Antonio Vargas – Pulitzer Prize-winning journalist
 Annie Wells – Pulitzer Prize-winning photojournalist
 Josh Wolf – independent journalist who videotaped an anti-G8 anarchist protest in San Francisco in 2005

Literature
 Oscar Zeta Acosta – writer, activist, attorney
 Kim Addonizio – poet and novelist
 Rae Armantrout – Pulitzer Prize-winning poet
 James Brown – novelist
 Patrick Califia – writer and poet
 Laban Coblentz – writer, educator, science policy adviser, international civil servant, entrepreneur
 Rishi Vohra – novelist
 Kelly Corrigan – writer
 Adam Cornford – poet, librettist, and essayist
 Jane Cutler – writer
 Carol Muske-Dukes – former California Poet Laureate
 Ernest J. Gaines – novelist, National Humanities Medal winner, The Autobiography of Miss Jane Pittman Leonard Gardner – novelist
 Jack Gilbert (1925-2012) – poet
 Eugene Gloria – poet
 Linda Gregg – poet
 Gerald Haslam – novelist, essayist, writer, public speaker
 Jonathan Holden – poet
 Bill Lee – author
 Russell Leong – author and philosopher
 Devorah Major – writer
 Frances Mayes – poet, memoirist, essayist, novelist
 Michael McClure –  poet, playwright, songwriter, and novelist
 Richard Melo – writer, author of Jokerman 8, a novel set at San Francisco State University
 Alyce Miller – writer
 Janice Mirikitani – poet and activist
 Cherríe Moraga – writer and activist
 Anne Rice – writer
 Kathy Lou Schultz – poet, scholar
 John Saul – horror novelist
 Ron Silliman – poet
 Daniel Silva – journalist and novelist
 Rebecca Solnit – writer, contributing editor at Harper's Magazine Kate Small – writer
 Philip Schultz – Pulitzer Prize-winning author
 Chad Sweeney – poet
 Gail Tsukiyama – novelist
 Rickey Vincent – author and Ethnic Studies professor
 Vivian Walsh – writer, Olive, the Other Reindeer and other children's books
 Shawn Wong – author and English professor
 Kirby Wright – writer

Media
 Jack Angel – voice actor
 Gary Austin (1941-2017) – founder of the Groundlings theatre
 Margaret Avery – actress nominated for an Academy Award for The Color Purple; earned her B.A. in education.
 Tory Belleci – special effects engineer and cast member on MythBusters Annette Bening – Academy Award-nominated actress, American Beauty, The American President, The Kids Are All Right Alex Borstein – actress on MadTV, voice of Lois on Family Guy Christopher Boyes – Academy Award-winning sound editor and mixer
 Bernard Bragg – actor
 Kari Byron – artist, cast member on the Discovery Channel show MythBusters David Carradine (1936-2009) – actor
 Dana Carvey – comedian
 Peter Casey – Emmy Award-winning producer and writer, Frasier, Cheers, The Jeffersons, Wings Roger Chang – computer enthusiast, TV personality
 Glen Charles – writer-producer
 Vernon Chatman – member of art collective/rock band PFFR, co-creator of Wonder Showzen and Xavier Margaret Cho –  comedian and actress
 Lisa Cholodenko – screenwriter and director
 Stephen Colletti – actor, One Tree Hill, Laguna Beach: The Real Orange County Peter Coyote – actor and author
 Robert Culp (1930-2010) – actor, I Spy, The Greatest American Hero, Everybody Loves Raymond Michael Curtis – Emmy Award-nominated producer and writer, Friends, JONASHari Dhillon – actor, Holby City, a British drama series
 Deepti Divakar – Indian model, actress, writer and Miss India World 1981
 Roger Dobkowitz – producer, The Price Is Right Walt Dohrn – actor, voice of Rumpelstiltskin in Shrek Forever After Arthur Dong – documentary filmmaker
 Keir Dullea – actor, best known for starring in 2001: A Space Odyssey Dina Eastwood – former television news anchor, star of Mrs. Eastwood & Company on E!; married to Clint Eastwood
 André Fenley – Award-winning, senior sound editor for Skywalker Sound.
 George Fenneman (1919-1997) – radio and television announcer
 Anthony C. Ferrante – director, producer and writer
 Keith Fowler – actor, director, educator
 Danny Glover – actor
 Nina Hartley – adult actress, author, feminist, activist
 Ellen Idelson (1961-2003) – television producer, writer and actress
 Daren Kagasoff – actor
 Sammi Kane Kraft (1992-2012) – actress
 John Lee – member of art collective/rock band PFFR, co-creator of Wonder Showzen and Xavier Lynn Hershman Leeson –  artist and filmmaker
Madeleine Lim – award-winning filmmaker, LGBTQ activist, and founder of QWOCMAP
 Delroy Lindo – actor
 Rosie Malek-Yonan – actor and author of The Crimson Field Mary Mara – actress
 Joseph E. Marshall, Jr. – radio talk show host
 Irene McGee – talk show host, former cast member of The Real World: Seattle Mike McShane – actor, improvisational comedian
 Michael Medved – film critic and radio talk show host
 Shawn Murphy – Academy Award-winning sound editor
 Rex Navarette – comedian
 Melissa Ng – Hong Kong actress, first runner-up at Miss Chinese International Pageant 1996
 Steven Okazaki – documentary filmmaker
 Greg Proops –  comedian and improviser best known for Whose Line is it Anyway? Jonas Rivera – Academy Award-winning producer of Inside Out Ronnie Schell – comedian and actor
 Rob Schneider – comedic actor
 Adivi Sesh –  Indian film actor, director, and screenwriter
 Ben Shedd – Academy Award-winning filmmaker
 Harry Shum, Jr. – actor, dancer, Glee Frank Silva (1950-1995) – actor, Twin Peaks Daniel J. Sullivan –  theatre director and playwright
 Rita Taggart – actress, Night Court Jeffrey Tambor – actor
 Ethan Van der Ryn – Academy Award-winning sound editor
 Janet Varney – actress, comedian
 Adrian Voo – actor
 David Wallechinsky – populist historian and television commentator
 Carl Weathers – actor, best known for starring in the Rocky films, Predator, and Happy Gilmore B.D. Wong – actor
 Steven Zaillian – Academy Award-winning screenwriter; wrote screenplay for Schindler's ListMusic
 Annette A. Aguilar – percussionist, bandleader, and music educator
 Vernon Alley (1915-2004) – jazz bassist
 Mike Burkett – lead singer of NOFX
 Paul Desmond (1924-1977) – jazz musician, member of The Dave Brubeck Quartet and composer of "Take Five"
 George Duke (1946-2013) – musician and producer
 Jennifer Finch –  bass player for the rock band L7
 Don Falcone – musician and producer
 Paul Gemignani – Broadway musical director
 Noah Georgeson – musician and producer
 Vince Guaraldi (1928-1976) – jazz musician and composer of the Peanuts cartoon music
 Kirk Hammett – Metallica's lead guitarist
 Dan Hicks (1941-2016) – musician, member of The Charlatans, leader of Dan Hicks and His Hot Licks
 Ella Jenkins – folk singer
 Johnny Mathis – singer
 Dean Menta – composer / guitarist for Faith No More and Sparks
 Steven Miller – producer, arranger, and record company executive
 Kent Nagano – conductor
 Daniel M. Nakamura – a.k.a. Dan the Automator, hip hop producer
 Pauline Oliveros (1932-2016) – composer, accordionist and electronic art musician
 John Patitucci – jazz double bass and jazz fusion electric bass player
 Terry Riley – composer
 Pete Rugolo (1915-2011) – jazz composer, arranger and record producer
 Cal Tjader (1925-1982) – jazz musician
 Joe Louis Walker – electric blues guitarist, singer, songwriter and producer
 Janet Weiss – drummer for Sleater-Kinney
 Oliver Tree – (surrealist music) singer, songwriter, comedian, and filmmaker

Politics and Government
 Tom Ammiano – member of the California State Assembly (13th district)
 Herman Bottcher (1909-1944) – decorated U.S. Army soldier, veteran of the Spanish Civil War and World War II
 Barbara Brannon – Major General, United States Air Force
 Willie Brown – member and 58th Speaker of the California State Assembly and former mayor of San Francisco, California
 John L. Burton – former president pro tempore of the California State Senate
 Robert Campbell – member of the California State Assembly (1980-1996)
 Roscoe Cartwright (1919-1974) – first black Field Artilleryman promoted to Brigadier General
 Ron Dellums (1935-2018) – former mayor of Oakland and U.S. Representative from 1971–1998
 Saeb Erekat – Palestinian chief of the PLO Steering and Monitoring Committee'Politics in Palestine', Palestinian National Authority: The PA Ministerial Cabinet List, Emergency Cabinet, October 2003 – November 2003 , Jerusalem Media and Communication Centre.
 Heather Fong – former chief of police, San Francisco Police Department
 Larry Galizio – member of the Oregon House of Representatives
 Mike Gierau – member of the Wyoming Senate
 Darlene Iskra – first woman to command a U.S. Navy ship
 Ed Jew – politician
 Cleve Jones – AIDS and LGBT rights activist
 Keith Kerr – military general and gay rights activist
 Fred H. Lau – former chief of police, San Francisco Police Department
 Nicole LeFavour – Idaho State Senator
 Wilma Mankiller (1945-2010) – first woman elected to serve as chief of the Cherokee Nation
 John Márquez – politician
 George Miller – U.S. Congressman, 1975-2015
 Richard Oakes (1942-1972) – Native American activist
 William Wayne Paul (1939-1989) – political activist, photographer and martial artist
 Nemesio Prudente (1927-2008) – political activist and president of the Polytechnic University of the Philippines
 Pierre Salinger (1925-2004) – White House Press Secretary for JFK and LBJ
 Harpreet Sandhu – Richmond, California politician and Sikh community leader
 Mario Savio (1942-1996) – political activist, key member in the Berkeley Free Speech Movement
 David Schuman – Judge of the Oregon Court of Appeals
 Mu Sochua – Cambodian Member of Parliament and women's rights activist
 Bill Thomas – former Congressman and chairman of the House Ways and Means Committee
 Leland Yee – California State Senator
 Mohammad Javad Zarif – Iranian Foreign Minister

Science and Technology
 R. Paul Butler – astronomer
 Yvonne Cagle – NASA astronaut
 Douglas Crockford – programmer, specifier of JSON, JavaScript language developer
 Hillman Curtis (1961-2012) – pioneering web designer
 Debra Fischer – astronomy professor, Yale University
 Gerta Keller – paleontologist, professor of Geosciences at Princeton University
 Gilman Louie – technologist, venture capitalist, game designer; former CEO of Spectrum HoloByte, Inc., In-Q-Tel; Chairman of the Federation of American Scientists
 Stanley Mazor – co-inventor of the microprocessor
 Amalia Mesa-Bains – psychologist and artist
 Sophie Molholm  –  neuroscientist and academic, Albert Einstein College of Medicine
 Alison Murray – biochemist and Antarctic researcher
 Dan Werthimer – co-founder and chief scientist of SETI@home
 Joseph White (1932-2017) – psychologist, godfather of Black Psychology

Sports
 Kevin Anderson – athletic director for the University of Maryland, College Park
 Billy Baird – New York Jets player (1963-1969) and coach (1981-1984)
 Bebe Bryans – United States and Olympic head coach in women's rowing
 Ken Carter – education activist and former high school basketball coach
 Paul Cayard – professional sailor
 Elmer Collett – NFL player, 1967-1977
 Ali Dia – professional soccer player
 Maury Duncan – NFL and CFL player, 1954-1958
Esmé Emmanuel (born 1947) - South African tennis player
 Tommy Harper – MLB player, 1962-1976
 Bud Harrelson – MLB player, 1965-1980
 Mike Holmgren – SFSU football coach; later NFL coach and executive, 1986-2012
 Joe Jackson – American football player
 Carl Kammerer – NFL player, 1961-1969
 Gilbert Melendez – professional mixed martial artist, former World Extreme Cagefighting and Strikeforce Lightweight Champion, UFC lightweight contender
 Floyd Peters (1936-2008) – NFL player (1958-1970) and coach (1974-1996)
 Jim Sochor (1938-2015) – football player and coach
 Jake Shields – professional mixed martial artist, former Strikeforce Middleweight Champion, and formerly competing for the UFC
 Jesse Taylor (attended) – wrestler, mixed martial arts fighter
 Bob Toledo – football player and coach

Other
 Vester Lee Flanagan II (1973–2015) – gunman in the deaths of two U.S. journalists
 Lee Francis (1945–2003) – poet, educator, and founder of the Wordcraft Circle of Native Writers and Storytellers
 Eva Galperin – director of cybersecurity at the Electronic Frontier Foundation
 Stephen Gaskin (1935–2014) – author, teacher, public speaker, political activist, and philanthropic organizer
 Aidan Kelly – academic, poet and influential figure in the Neopagan religion of Wicca
 Chandra Levy (1977–2001) – intern; murdered 2001 in Washington, D.C.
 Jaime Levy – interface designer and user experience strategist
 Ruth B. Love – former superintendent of the Oakland Unified School District and Chicago Public Schools
 Marianne O'Grady – deputy country director Afghanistan with Care International, during Fall of Kabul (2021)
Roxanne Dunbar-Ortiz – Professor Emerita of Ethnic Studies at California State University, East Bay
 James Van Praagh – self-proclaimed medium, recipient of the 2012 Pigasus Award in the category "Refusal to face reality"
 Alice Fong Yu (1905–2000) – first Chinese American public school teacher in California

Faculty
 Craig Abaya – artist
 Rabab Abdulhadi (born 1955), Palestinian-born American scholar, activist, educator, editor, and an academic director.
 Kim Addonizio – poet, novelist
 Dale Allender – educator
 Herbert Blau (1926–2013) – theater director, co-director of the San Francisco Actor's Workshop, 1953–1965
 Zita Cabello-Barrueto – professor, activist 
 Jeffery Paul Chan – professor of Asian American studies and English
 Philip Choy (1926–2017) – historian
 Larry Clark – member of L.A. Rebellion School of Black Filmmakers
Walter Van Tilburg Clark – founder of the Creative Writing program; author of The Ox-Bow Incident John Collier Jr. (1913–1992) – anthropologist
 August Coppola (1936–2009) – Dean of Creative Arts
 Angela Davis (born 1944) – professor of ethnic studies
 Roland De Wolk – journalist, Pulitzer Prize winner
 Richard Festinger – composer
 Bennett Friedman – musician, saxophonist
 Gloria Frym – poet, fiction writer, and essayist
 Sally Miller Gearhart – feminist, science fiction writer, and political activist
 Vartan Gregorian – former professor, president of Carnegie Corporation of New York
 John Gutmann (1905–1998) – photographer
 Milton Halberstadt (1919–2000) – photographer, artist
 John Handy – jazz musician
 Nathan Hare – first coordinator of black studies, founding publisher of The Black Scholar, sociologist, psychologist
 S. I. Hayakawa (1906–1992) – former SFSU president, and U.S. Senator
 Paul Hoover – poet
 Ralf Hotchkiss – Distinguished Research Scientist in the Department of Engineering
 Jules Irving (1925–1979) – actor, director, co-director of the San Francisco Actors' Workshop, 1953–1965, and artistic director of the Repertory Company of Lincoln Center, NYC
 Persis Karim (b. 1962) – poet, editor, the Neda Nobari Distinguished Chair and director of the Center for Iranian Diaspora Studies
 John Keith Irwin (1929–2010) – professor of sociology
 Russell Jeung – professor of sociology, co-founder of Stop AAPI Hate
 Luis Kemnitzer (1928–2006) – anthropologist, political activist
 Dean H. Kenyon – Professor Emeritus of Biology, author of Of Pandas and People, one of the main proponents of intelligent design
 Michael Krasny – professor of English
 Catherine Kudlick – professor of history, director of the Paul K. Longmore Institute on Disability
 David Kuraoka – ceramic artist
 Bruce A. Manning – professor of chemistry and biochemistry
 Eric Mar – lecturer on Asian American Studies, politician, member of the San Francisco Board of Supervisors
 Geoff Marcy – astronomer, discoverer of more than 150 extrasolar planets
 David Matsumoto – psychologist
 Joseph McBride – author and film historian
 Dave McElhatton (1928–2010) – journalist, evening news anchor
 Sandra Lee McKay – linguist
 Jan Millsapps – writer, filmmaker
 Mahmood Monshipouri (born 1952) – scholar, author, educator
 Wright Morris (1910–1998) – novelist and photographer, professor of English (1962-1975)
 Alejandro Murguía – San Francisco Poet Laureate (2012)
 Pete Najarian – writer
 Jacob Needleman – philosopher of religion
 Bill Nichols – Professor Emeritus in the Cinema Department
 Roger Nixon (1921–2009) – composer, musician
 Peter Orner – writer
 Wayne Peterson – composer, Pulitzer Prize winner
 Stan Rice (1942–2002) – professor of English and creative writing
 Moses Rischin – historian
 Stephen Rodefer (1940–2015) – poet
 Theodore Roszak (1933–2011) – historian, author of The Making of a Counter Culture''
 Vic Rowen (1919–2013) – football player and coach
 Carol Lee Sanchez – poet, visual artist, essayist
 Irving Saraf (1932–2012) – Academy Award-winning film director and producer, former professor of film production
 James Schevill (1920–2009) – poet, critic, and playwright
 Anita Silvers – (1940–2019) – philosopher of science, disability rights activist
 Nick Sousanis – cartoonist
 Askia M. Touré – poet, professor, and activist associated with the Black Arts Movement
 Bas van Fraassen – Philosopher of Science, Distinguished Professor of Philosophy at SFSU, Fellow of the British Academy, and Fellow of the American Academy of Arts and Sciences
 Sylvia Solochek Walters – Professor Emeritus of Art, artist and printmaker
 Carleton Washburne (1889–1968) – author and educational reformer
 Roger Woodward – pianist

References

 
San Francisco State University
San Francisco State University people